The  Ministry of Industry and Mineral Resources (MIM) is a Saudi government body responsible for the industry and mineral resources operations. The Ministry was established on 30 August 2019 after the separation of the Ministry of Energy, Industry and Mineral Resources into the Ministry of Energy and the Ministry of Industry and Mineral Resources. The Ministry aims to diversify the economy of the Kingdom away from the oil. Bandar Alkhorayef was appointed as a minister of the Ministry of Industry and Mineral Resources.

References 

2019 establishments in Saudi Arabia
Industry
Saudi